The 1935 Ohio State Buckeyes football team represented Ohio State University in the 1935 college football season. The Buckeyes compiled a 7–1 record with a 5–0 mark in Big Ten Conference play. Ohio State won their first Big Ten title in 15 years, outscoring opponents 237–57.

On November 23, 1935, Ohio State defeated Michigan, 38-0, at Michigan Stadium. It remains the worst defeat for a Michigan team in the history of the Michigan–Ohio State football rivalry. Michigan was held to 12 rushing yards and 73 passing yards. Richard Heekin scored two touchdowns for Ohio State. Tippy Dye returned a punt 65 yards for a touchdown. Johnny Bettridge and Frank Boucher also scored touchdowns for the Buckeyes.

Schedule

Coaching staff
 Francis Schmidt, head coach, second year

1936 NFL draftees

References

Ohio State
Ohio State Buckeyes football seasons
Big Ten Conference football champion seasons
Ohio State Buckeyes football